Mediterranean island country of Malta was the third European member state of the Non-Aligned Movement (after charter members of Cyprus and SFR Yugoslavia) joining it in 1973. The country remained a part of the movement until 2004 when one of the requirements of the 2004 enlargement of the European Union was for Malta to leave the Non-Aligned Movement. European integration process therefore affected and limited further Maltese integration and engagement with its Non-Aligned neighbouring states.

Maltese participation in the movement was motivated by advocacy of peace and development in the Mediterranean and was intensified in the aftermath of the departure of the remaining British troops from the island in 1979. Maltese association with the Non-Aligned countries during the Cold War was promoted by South European (Greek, Portuguese and Maltese) left wing parties closer association with the ideas of the NAM group than with the ideas of the Western European social democracy. In 1984 the country hosted the first in a series of the Mediterranean Non-Aligned Countries Ministerial Meetings.

Principles of neutrality and non-alignment were included into the Constitution of Malta in 1986 as a part of a compromise deal between the ruling Malta Labour Party the major oppositional Nationalist Party.

See also
 Foreign relations of Malta
 EU Med Group
 Cyprus–Malta relations
 Malta–Yugoslavia relations
 Libya–Malta relations
 Neutral and Non-Aligned European States

References

Foreign relations of Malta
History of Malta
Euromediterranean Partnership